In ancient Celtic religion, Maponos or Maponus ("Great Son") is a god of youth known mainly in northern Britain but also in Gaul. In Roman Britain, he was equated with Apollo.

The Welsh mythological figure Mabon ap Modron is apparently derived from Maponos, who by analogy we may suggest was the son of the mother-goddess Dea Matrona. The Irish god Aengus, also known as the Mac Óg ("young son"), is probably related to Maponos, as are the Arthurian characters Mabuz and Mabonagrain.

Etymology
In Gaulish, mapos means a young boy or a son. The suffix -onos is augmentative. Besides the theonym Maponos, the root mapos is found in personal names such as Mapodia, Mapillus, and Maponius; mapo is also found in the Carjac inscription (RIG L-86). The root is Proto-Indo-European *makʷos. (Delamarre 2003 pp. 216–217).

In Insular Celtic languages, the same root is found in Welsh, Cornish and Breton mab meaning son (Delamarre 2003 pp. 216–217), derived from Common Brythonic *mapos (identical to Gaulish). In Old Irish, macc also means son; it is found in Ogham inscriptions as the genitive maqui, maqqi, maqui (Sims-Williams 2003 pp. 430–431) with a geminative expressive doubling *makʷkʷos. (This is the source of Scottish and Irish names starting Mac or Mc as well as Welsh or Cornish names Ap, often shortened to just 'P-).

He therefore personified youthfulness, which would explain the syncretism with the Graeco-Roman god Apollo.

Evidence for Maponos

Epigraphy
The evidence is mainly epigraphic. Maponos (“Great Son”) is mentioned in Gaul at Bourbonne-les-Bains (CIL 13, 05924) and at Chamalières (RIG L-100) but is attested chiefly in the north of Britain at Brampton, Corbridge (ancient Coria), Ribchester (In antiquity, Bremetenacum Veteranorum) and Chesterholm (in antiquity, Vindolanda). Some inscriptions are very simple such as Deo Mapono ("to the god Maponos") from Chesterholm (AE 1975, 00568). At Corbridge  are two dedications  (RIB 1120 and RIB 1121) Apollini Mapono ("to Apollo Maponos") and one (RIB 1122) [Deo] / [M]apo[no] / Apo[llini] ("to the god Maponos Apollo"). The inscription at Brampton (RIB 2063) by four Germans is to the god Maponos and the numen of the emperor:.

Deo / Mapono / et n(umini) Aug(usti) / Durio / et Ramio / et Trupo / et Lurio / Germa/ni v(otum) s(olverunt) l(ibentes) m(erito)"To the god Maponos and to the Numen of Augustus, the Germani Durio, Ramio, Trupo and Lurio have fulfilled their vow willingly, as is deserved."

This inscription (RIB 583) by a unit of Sarmatians based at Ribchester shows the association with Apollo and also can be precisely dated to the day (pridie Kalendas Septembres, or 29 August in the Roman calendar) and the year (241 CE, by mention of the two consuls).

Deo san(cto) / [A]pollini Mapono / [pr]o salute d(omini) n(ostri) / [et] n(umeri) eq(uitum) Sar/[m(atarum)] Bremetenn(acensium) / [G]ordiani / [A]el(ius) Antoni/nus |(centurio) leg(ionis) VI / vic(tricis) domo / Melitenis / praep(ositus) et pr(aefectus) / v(otum) s(olvit) l(ibens) m(erito) / [de]dic(atum) pr(idie) Kal(endas) Sep(tembres) / [Im]p(eratore) d(omino) n(ostro) Gord[i]/[ano A]ug(usto) II e[t] Pon[peia]no(!) co(n)s(ulibus)

The preceding inscriptions are all in Latin. The name is also found on the inscription from Chamalières, which is a relatively long magical text (12 lines) written in Gaulish on a rolled lead sheet. The second line calls for the help of Maponos (here in the accusative singular, Maponon: artiu maponon aruerriíatin (RIG L-100).

Iconography
There are at least three statues to Maponos. In one, he is depicted as a harper and stands opposite a Celtic Diana huntress figure. A sketch of this image appears in Ann Ross' Pagan Celtic Britain.

Toponymy
Two items of place-name evidence also attest to Maponos in Britain. Both are from the 7th-century Ravenna Cosmography. Locus Maponi (Richmond & Crawford #228) or "the place of Maponos", is thought to be between Lochmaben and Lockerbie (the name Lochmaben may be derived from Locus Maponi, with the p to b sound shift). Maporiton (Richmond & Crawford #163) or "the ford of Maponos" is thought to be Ladyward, near Lockerbie. The Lochmaben Stone lies near Gretna on the farm named Old Graitney, the old name for Gretna. The name Clachmaben, meaning 'stone of Maben or Maponos', has become corrupted to Lochmaben. This stone was probably part of a stone circle and the area is thought to have been a centre for the worship of Maponus. An inscription from Birrens in Scotland (RIB-3, 3482 / AE 1968, 254) mentions a lo(cus) Mabomi, which is often regarded as a stone-cutter's error for locus *Maponi.

Coligny Calendar
The fifteenth day of Riuros on the Coligny calendar is marked with the name Mapanos, which might be a reference to a festival for Maponos.

Celtic epithets of Apollo
In Britain, dedications to Apollo have been found with the following epithets: 
 Apollo Anextiomarus
 Apollo Anicetus Sol
 Apollo Grannus
 Apollo Maponus (shows a Latinising influence, -os becoming -us). 
It can thus be difficult to tell from a simple dedication to Apollo whether the classical deity is meant  or whether a particular Celtic deity is being referred to under a classical name. The situation in Gaul is even more complicated, with at least twenty epithets being recorded. (Jufer & Luginbühl pp. 94–96).

Later tradition

Welsh mythology
Maponos surfaces in the Middle Welsh narrative, the Mabinogion, as Mabon, son of Modron (a similar character in Welsh literature is Mabon son of Mellt, who may in fact be the same as Mabon son of Modron), who is herself the continuation of Gaulish Matrona (“Matronly Spirit”). The theme of Maponos son of Matrona (literally, child of mother) and the development of names in the Mabinogi from Common Brythonic and Gaulish theonyms has been examined by Hamp (1999),  Lambert (1979), and Meid (1991). Mabon apparently features in the tale of a newborn child taken from his mother at the age of three nights, and is explicitly named in the story of Culhwch ac Olwen.

His name lives on in Arthurian romance in the guise of Mabon, Mabuz, and Mabonagrain.

Irish mythology
His counterpart in Irish mythology would seem to be Mac(c) ind Ó‘c (Hamp 1999) (“Young Son”, “Young Lad”), an epithet of Angus or Oengus, the eternally youthful spirit to be found in Newgrange called Bruigh na Bóinne, a pre-Celtic Neolithic barrow or chambered tomb. Irish mythology portrays him as the son of the Dagda, a king of the Irish gods, and of Boann, a personification of the River Boyne. In Irish mythology, the Macc Óc frequently features as a trickster and a lover.

See also
Chamalières tablet

References

Bibliography
 Année Epigraphique (AE), yearly volumes.
 Corpus Inscriptionum Latinarum (CIL); vol. XIII, Inscriptiones trium Galliarum et Germaniarum
 Collingwood, R. G.; Wright, R. P. The Roman Inscriptions of Britain (RIB) Vol. 1:  The Inscriptions on Stone.
 Delamarre, X. (2003). Dictionnaire de la Langue Gauloise (2nd ed.). Paris: Editions Errance.  
Ellis, Peter Berresford (1994) Dictionary of Celtic Mythology (Oxford Paperback Reference), Oxford University Press. 
 Hamp, E. (1999) "Mabinogi and Archaism". Celtica 23, pp. 96–110. Available online PDF file
 Jufer, N. and Luginbühl, T. (2001) Répertoire des dieux gaulois. Paris, Editions Errance. 
 Lambert, Pierre-Yves  (1979) "La tablette gauloise de Chamalières". Études Celtiques XVI pp. 141–169
 Lambert, Pierre-Yves (ed)(2002) Recueil des Inscriptions Gauloises (R.I.G.) Vol. 2.2: inscriptions in the Latin alphabet on instrumentum (ceramic, lead, glass etc.) (items L-18 – L-139)
MacKillop, James (1998) Dictionary of Celtic Mythology. Oxford: Oxford University Press. .
 Meid, W. (1991) Aspekte der germanischen und keltischen Religion im Zeugnis der Sprache. (Innsbrucker Beiträge zur Sprachwissenschaft, Vorträge und kleinere Schriften, 52.)
 Richmond, I. A. and Crawford, O. G. S. (1949) "The British Section of the Ravenna Cosmography". Archaeologia XCIII pp. 1–50
 Sims-Williams, Patrick  (2003) The Celtic Inscriptions of Britain: phonology and chronology, c. 400-1200 Oxford: Blackwell. 
Wood, Juliette, (2002) The Celts: Life, Myth, and Art. Thorsons Publishers.

External links

Locus Maponi
Maporitum

Celtic gods
Health gods